Glukhov, Glukhova  may refer to:

Hlukhiv, a town in Sumy Oblast, Ukraine, known in Russian as Glukhov

People with the surname
Alexei Glukhov (born 1984), Russian ice hockey player
Andrey Glukhov (born 1972), Russian Olympic rower
Konstantin Gluhov (born 1990), Latvian-Russian kickboxer and mixed martial artist
Mikhail Glukhov (born 1988), Russian ice hockey player
Sergey Glukhov (born 1993), Russian curler

See also
Glukhovo
Glukhovka